Miha Šporar (born 31 July 1972) is a Slovenian former professional footballer who played as a centre-back. He played over 200 games in the Slovenian PrvaLiga.

Personal life
Miha Šporar's son is Andraž Šporar who is also professional footballer. He transferred from Olimpija to Basel in December 2015.

References

External links
 

1972 births
Living people
Slovenian footballers
Association football central defenders
NK Ljubljana players
NK Celje players
NK Olimpija Ljubljana (1945–2005) players
NK Domžale players
NK Olimpija Ljubljana (2005) players
Slovenian PrvaLiga players